NGC 68 is a lenticular galaxy, and the central member of the NGC 68 group, in the constellation Andromeda. The galaxy was discovered on September 11, 1784, by William Herschel, who observed the NGC 68 group as a single object and described it as "extremely faint, large, 3 or 4 stars plus nebulosity". As such, his reported location is between NGC 68, NGC 70, and NGC 71. By the time Dreyer looked at the galaxies to add to the NGC catalog, however, he was able to tell that the single galaxy observed by Herschel was in fact 3 adjacent galaxies, and cataloged them as NGC 68, NGC 70, and NGC 71.

References

External links
 

0068
01187
00170
+05-01-065
Lenticular galaxies
17840911
Andromeda (constellation)
Discoveries by William Herschel